Sagridola luteicornis is a species of beetle in the family Cerambycidae. It was described by Boppe in 1921.

References

Dorcasominae
Beetles described in 1921